Marie Bosse, also known as La Bosse (died 8 May 1679), was a French poisoner, fortune teller and alleged witch. She was one of the accused in the famous Poison affair. It was Marie Bosse who pointed out the central figure La Voisin.

Bosse, the widow of a horse trader, was one of the most successful fortune tellers in Paris. Unofficially, she was also a poisoner, who provided poison to people who wished to commit murder. By the end of 1678, Bosse attended a party held by her friend Marie Vigoreaux, the wife of a dressmaker, in the Rue Courtauvilain. During the party, she became drunk and boasted freely that she had become so wealthy by selling deadly poisons to members of the aristocracy that she would soon be able to retire. At the time, the Paris police was investigating poison sales in Paris. A guest at the party, the lawyer Maitre Perrin, reported the conversation to the police. The police sent the wife of a police officer to Bosse to ask for poison to murder her husband, and Bosse provided her with what proved to be deadly poison.

On the morning 4 January 1679, Marie Bosse was arrested with her daughter Manon and her sons, François and Guillaume. Her older son was a soldier in the royal guard, the younger one was recently released from a working house. According to the report, when the family was arrested they were found in the only bed in the house and had committed incest. Marie Vigoreaux was arrested the same day, and was found to have close ties to the family, as she had sexual relations with all of the members of the family. Their confessions revealed that the illegal sale of poison in the capital was handled by a network of fortune tellers. This led to the arrest of the central figure La Voisin and the opening of the Poison affair. Marie Bosse confessed to having provided the poison used by Marguerite de Poulaillon in her attempted murder of her husband. Marie Vigoreux died during interrogation under torture 9 May 1679.

Marie Bosse was condemned to death by burning and executed in Paris on 8 May 1679. Her children and associates were also sentenced to death.

In fiction 
Marie Bosse is portrayed in a novel by Judith Merkle Riley: The Oracle Glass (1994)

References
 William E. Burns: Witch hunts in Europe and America: an encyclopedia (2003)
 William R. Cullen: Is arsenic an aphrodisiac?: the sociochemistry of an element
 H Noel Williams: Madame de Montespan and Louis XIV
 Nigel Cawthorne: Witches: History of Persecution (2006)
 Frantz Funck-Brentano: Princes and Poisoners Or Studies of the Court of Louis XIV
 Frantz Funck-Brentano: Princes and Poisoners Or Studies of the Court of Louis XIV
 Frances Mossiker: The affair of the poisons: Louis XIV, Madame de Montespan, and one of history's great unsolved mysteries (1970)
 Marie Cher: Poison at Court; Certain Figures of the Reign of Louis the Fourteenth
 Thérèse Louis Latour: Princesses, ladies & adventuresses of the reign of Louis XIV (1924)
 Arlette Lebigre: 1679-1682, l'affaire des poisons

1679 deaths
1679 crimes
French occultists
Poisoners
People executed for witchcraft
French people executed for witchcraft
17th-century executions by France
Executed French women
People executed by France by burning
17th-century occultists
Year of birth unknown
17th-century French criminals
17th-century French businesswomen
17th-century French businesspeople
Affair of the Poisons